Lisanti Chapel is a historic chapel at 740 E. 215th Street, Bronx, New York in the Williamsbridge neighborhood of The Bronx.

It was built in 1905 by Francesco Lisanti, an Italian Immigrant, and added to the National Register of Historic Places in 2002.

The chapel has pointed-arched window and door openings and various other subtle Gothic Revival details with a Southern Italian character; the date plaque is inscribed:
"F LISANTI
IN DEVOZIONE
DELL IMMACOLATA
PER SE E FAMIGLIA
ERESSE
1905"

References

Gothic Revival church buildings in New York City
Italian-American culture in the Bronx
Roman Catholic churches in the Bronx
Properties of religious function on the National Register of Historic Places in the Bronx
Roman Catholic churches completed in 1905
Roman Catholic chapels in the United States
Williamsbridge, Bronx
1905 establishments in New York City
20th-century Roman Catholic church buildings in the United States